The customer edge router (CE) is the router at the customer premises that is connected to the provider edge router of a service provider IP/MPLS network. The CE router peers with the provider edge router (PE) and exchanges routes with the corresponding VRF inside the PE. The routing protocol used could be static or dynamic (an interior gateway protocol like OSPF or an exterior gateway protocol like BGP).

The customer edge router can either be owned by the customer or service provider.

See also
 Provider edge router
 Provider router

References 

Routers (computing)
MPLS networking